The 2002 GP Ouest-France was the 66th edition of the GP Ouest-France cycle race and was held on 25 August 2002. The race started and finished in Plouay. The race was won by Jeremy Hunt of the  team.

General classification

References

2002
2002 in road cycling
2002 in French sport
August 2002 sports events in France